Bullia natalensis, the pleated plough shell, is a species of sea snail, a marine gastropod mollusk in the family Nassariidae, the Nassa mud snails or dog whelks.

Description
The length of the shell varies between 20 mm and 60 mm.

Distribution
This species occurs off Mozambique and the East Coast of South Africa.

References

 Cernohorsky W. O. (1984). Systematics of the family Nassariidae (Mollusca: Gastropoda). Bulletin of the Auckland Institute and Museum 14: 1–356.
 Marais J.P. & Kilburn R.N. (2010) Nassariidae. pp. 138–173, in: Marais A.P. & Seccombe A.D. (eds), Identification guide to the seashells of South Africa. Volume 1. Groenkloof: Centre for Molluscan Studies. 376 pp.

External links
 Branch, G.M. et al. (2002). Two Oceans. 5th impression. David Philip, Cate Town & Johannesburg
 

Nassariidae
Gastropods described in 1848
Taxa named by Christian Ferdinand Friedrich Krauss